Heart 93.7 (DXIZ 93.7 MHz) is an FM station owned and operated by Highland Broadcasting Network. Its studios and transmitter are located at the 2nd Floor, ZGas Bldg., Purok 6A, Brgy. South Poblacion, Maramag. The frequency is formerly owned by Rizal Memorial Colleges Broadcasting Corporation.

References

External Links
Heart 93.7 FB Page

Radio stations in Bukidnon
Radio stations established in 2021